Castelletto Stura is a comune (municipality) in the Province of Cuneo in the Italian region Piedmont, located about  south of Turin and about  northeast of Cuneo.

Castelletto Stura borders the following municipalities: Centallo, Cuneo, Montanera, and Morozzo. It is home to the Venchi chocolate manufacturer.

References

Cities and towns in Piedmont